Strategic realism is a theory of international relations associated with Thomas Schelling.

References

International relations theory
Political realism